

Events

Pre-1600
 455 – Emperor Petronius Maximus is stoned to death by an angry mob while fleeing Rome. 
1223 – Mongol invasion of the Cumans: Battle of the Kalka River: Mongol armies of Genghis Khan led by Subutai defeat Kievan Rus' and Cumans.
1293 – Mongol invasion of Java was a punitive expedition against King Kertanegara of Singhasari, who had refused to pay tribute to the Yuan and maimed one of its ministers. However, it ended with failure for the Mongols. Regarded as establish City of Surabaya
1578 – King Henry III lays the first stone of the Pont Neuf (New Bridge), the oldest bridge of Paris, France.

1601–1900
1610 – The pageant London's Love to Prince Henry on the River Thames celebrates the creation of Prince Henry as Prince of Wales.
1669 – Citing poor eyesight as a reason, Samuel Pepys records the last event in his diary.
1775 – American Revolution: The Mecklenburg Resolves are adopted in the Province of North Carolina.
1790 – Manuel Quimper explores the Strait of Juan de Fuca.
  1790   – The United States enacts its first copyright statute, the Copyright Act of 1790.
1795 – French Revolution: The Revolutionary Tribunal is suppressed.
1805 – French and Spanish forces begin the assault against British forces occupying Diamond Rock, Martinique.
1813 – In Australia, William Lawson, Gregory Blaxland and William Wentworth reach Mount Blaxland, effectively marking the end of a route across the Blue Mountains.
1859 – The clock tower at the Houses of Parliament, which houses Big Ben, starts keeping time.
1862 – American Civil War: Peninsula Campaign: Confederate forces under Joseph E. Johnston and G.W. Smith engage Union forces under George B. McClellan outside the Confederate capital of Richmond, Virginia.
1864 – American Civil War: Overland Campaign: Battle of Cold Harbor: The Army of Northern Virginia engages the Army of the Potomac.
1879 – Gilmore's Garden in New York City is renamed Madison Square Garden by William Henry Vanderbilt and is opened to the public at 26th Street and Madison Avenue.
1884 – The arrival at Plymouth of Tāwhiao, King of Maoris, to claim the protection of Queen Victoria.
1889 – Johnstown Flood: Over 2,200 people die after a dam fails and sends a 60-foot (18-meter) wall of water over the town of Johnstown, Pennsylvania.

1901–present
1902 – Second Boer War: The Treaty of Vereeniging ends the war and ensures British control of South Africa.
1909 – The National Negro Committee, forerunner to the National Association for the Advancement of Colored People (NAACP), convenes for the first time.
1910 – The South Africa Act comes into force, establishing the Union of South Africa.
1911 – The RMS Titanic is launched in Belfast, Northern Ireland.
  1911   – The President of Mexico Porfirio Díaz flees the country during the Mexican Revolution.
1916 – World War I: Battle of Jutland: The British Grand Fleet engages the High Seas Fleet in the largest naval battle of the war, which proves indecisive.
1921 – The Tulsa race massacre kills at least 39, but other estimates of black fatalities vary from 55 to about 300.
1924 – Hope Development School fire kills 24 people, mostly disabled children.
1935 – A 7.7  earthquake destroys Quetta in modern-day Pakistan killing 40,000.
1941 – Anglo-Iraqi War: The United Kingdom completes the re-occupation of Iraq and returns 'Abd al-Ilah to power as regent for Faisal II.
1942 – World War II: Imperial Japanese Navy midget submarines begin a series of attacks on Sydney, Australia.
1947 – Ferenc Nagy, the democratically elected Prime Minister of Hungary, resigns from office after blackmail from the Hungarian Communist Party accusing him of being part of a plot against the state. This grants the Communists effective control of the Hungarian government. 
1951 – The Uniform Code of Military Justice takes effect as the legal system of the United States Armed Forces. 
1955 – The U.S. Supreme Court expands on its Brown v. Board of Education decision by ordering district courts and school districts to enforce educational desegregation "at all deliberate speed."  
1961 – The South African Constitution of 1961 becomes effective, thus creating the Republic of South Africa, which remains outside the Commonwealth of Nations until 1 June 1994, when South Africa is returned to Commonwealth membership.
  1961   – In Moscow City Court, the Rokotov–Faibishenko show trial begins, despite the Khrushchev Thaw to reverse Stalinist elements in Soviet society.
1962 – The West Indies Federation dissolves.
1970 – The 7.9  Ancash earthquake shakes Peru with a maximum Mercalli intensity of VIII (Severe) and a landslide buries the town of Yungay, Peru. Between 66,794 and 70,000 were killed and 50,000 were injured.
1971 – In accordance with the Uniform Monday Holiday Act passed by the U.S. Congress in 1968, observation of Memorial Day occurs on the last Monday in May for the first time, rather than on the traditional Memorial Day of May 30.
1973 – The United States Senate votes to cut off funding for the bombing of Khmer Rouge targets within Cambodia, hastening the end of the Cambodian Civil War.
  1973   – Indian Airlines Flight 440 crashes near Indira Gandhi International Airport, killing 48.
1977 – The Trans-Alaska Pipeline System is completed.
1985 – United States–Canada tornado outbreak: Forty-one tornadoes hit Ohio, Pennsylvania, New York, and Ontario, leaving 76 dead.
1991 – Bicesse Accords in Angola lay out a transition to multi-party democracy under the supervision of the United Nations' UNAVEM II peacekeeping mission.
2003 – Air France retires its fleet of Concorde aircraft.
2005 – Vanity Fair reveals that Mark Felt was "Deep Throat".
2008 – Usain Bolt breaks the world record in the 100m sprint, with a wind-legal (+1.7 m/s) 9.72 seconds
2010 – Israeli Shayetet 13 commandos boarded the Gaza Freedom Flotilla while still in international waters trying to break the ongoing blockade of the Gaza Strip; nine Turkish citizens on the flotilla were killed in the ensuing violent affray.
2013 – The asteroid 1998 QE2 and its moon make their closest approach to Earth for the next two centuries.
  2013   – A record breaking 2.6 mile wide tornado strikes near El Reno, Oklahoma, United States, causing eight fatalities (including three storm chasers) and over 150 injuries.
2016 – Syrian civil war: The Syrian Democratic Forces (SDF) launch the Manbij offensive, in order to capture the city of Manbij from the Islamic State of Iraq and the Levant (ISIL).
2017 – A car bomb explodes in a crowded intersection in Kabul near the German embassy during rush hour, killing over 90 and injuring 463.
2019 – A shooting occurs inside a municipal building at Virginia Beach, Virginia, leaving 13 people dead, including the shooter, and four others injured.

Births

Pre-1600
1443 (or 1441) – Margaret Beaufort, Countess of Richmond and Derby (d. 1509)
1462 – Philipp II, Count of Hanau-Lichtenberg (d. 1504)
1469 – Manuel I of Portugal (d. 1521)
1535 – Alessandro Allori, Italian painter (d. 1607)
1556 – Jerzy Radziwiłł, Catholic cardinal (d. 1600)
1577 – Nur Jahan, Empress consort of the Mughal Empire (d. 1645)

1601–1900
1613 – John George II, Elector of Saxony (d. 1680)
1640 – Michał Korybut Wiśniowiecki, King of Poland (d. 1673)
1641 – Patriarch Dositheos II of Jerusalem (d. 1707)
1725 – Ahilyabai Holkar, Queen of the Malwa Kingdom under the Maratha Empire (d. 1795)
1732 – Count Hieronymus von Colloredo, Austrian archbishop (d. 1812)
1753 – Pierre Victurnien Vergniaud, French lawyer and politician (d. 1793)
1754 – Andrea Appiani, Italian painter and educator (d. 1817)
1773 – Ludwig Tieck, German poet, author, and critic (d. 1853)
1801 – Johann Georg Baiter, Swiss philologist and scholar (d. 1887)
1812 – Robert Torrens, Irish-Australian politician, 3rd Premier of South Australia (d. 1884)
1815 – Adye Douglas, English-Australian cricketer and politician, 15th Premier of Tasmania (d. 1906)
1818 – John Albion Andrew, American lawyer and politician, 25th Governor of Massachusetts (d. 1867)
1819 – Walt Whitman, American poet, essayist, and journalist (d. 1892)
1827 – Kusumoto Ine, first Japanese female doctor of Western medicine (d. 1903)
1835 – Hijikata Toshizō, Japanese commander (d. 1869)
1838 – Henry Sidgwick, English economist and philosopher (d. 1900)
1842 – John Cox Bray, Australian politician, 15th Premier of South Australia (d. 1894)
1847 – William Pirrie, 1st Viscount Pirrie, Canadian-Irish businessman and politician, Lord Mayor of Belfast (d. 1924) 
1852 – Francisco Moreno, Argentinian explorer and academic (d. 1919)
  1852   – Julius Richard Petri, German microbiologist, invented the Petri dish (d. 1921)
1857 – Pope Pius XI (d. 1939)
1858 – Graham Wallas, English socialist, social psychologist, and educationalist (d. 1932)
1860 – Walter Sickert, English painter (d. 1942)
1863 – Francis Younghusband, Indian-English captain and explorer (d. 1942)
1866 – John Ringling, American entrepreneur; one of the founders of the Ringling Brothers Circus (d. 1936)
1875 – Rosa May Billinghurst, British suffragette and women's rights activist (d.1953)
1879 – Frances Alda, New Zealand-Australian soprano (d. 1952)
1882 – Sándor Festetics, Hungarian politician, Hungarian Minister of War (d. 1956)
1883 – Lauri Kristian Relander, Finnish politician, 2nd President of Finland (d. 1942)
1885 – Robert Richards, Australian politician, 32nd Premier of South Australia (d. 1967)
1887 – Saint-John Perse, French poet and diplomat, Nobel Prize laureate (d. 1975)
1892 – Michel Kikoine, Belarusian-French painter (d. 1968)
  1892   – Erich Neumann, German lieutenant and politician (d. 1951)
  1892   – Konstantin Paustovsky, Russian poet and author (d. 1968)
  1892   – Gregor Strasser, German lieutenant and politician (d. 1934)
1894 – Fred Allen, American comedian, radio host, game show panelist, and author (d. 1956)
1898 – Norman Vincent Peale, American minister and author (d. 1993)
1900 – Lucile Godbold, American athlete (d. 1981)

1901–present
1901 – Alfredo Antonini, Italian-American conductor and composer (d. 1983)
1908 – Don Ameche, American actor (d. 1993)
1909 – Art Coulter, Canadian-American ice hockey player (d. 2000)
1911 – Maurice Allais, French economist and physicist, Nobel Prize laureate (d. 2010)
1912 – Chien-Shiung Wu, Chinese-American experimental physicist (d. 1997)
1914 – Akira Ifukube, Japanese composer and educator (d. 2006)
1916 – Bert Haanstra, Dutch director, producer, and screenwriter (d. 1997)
1918 – Robert Osterloh, American actor (d. 2001)
  1918   – Lloyd Quarterman, African American chemist (d. 1982)
1919 – Robie Macauley, American editor, novelist and critic (d. 1995)
1921 – Edna Doré, English actress (d. 2014)
  1921   – Andrew Grima, Anglo-Italian jewellery designer (d. 2007)
  1921   – Howard Reig, American radio and television announcer (d. 2008)
  1921   – Alida Valli, Austrian-Italian actress and singer (d. 2006)
1922 – Denholm Elliott, English-Spanish actor (d. 1992)
1923 – Ellsworth Kelly, American painter and sculptor (d. 2015)
  1923   – Rainier III, Prince of Monaco (d. 2005)
  1923   – Claudio Matteini, Italian football player (d. 2003)
1925 – Julian Beck, American actor and director (d. 1986)
1927 – James Eberle, English admiral (d. 2018)
  1927   – Michael Sandberg, Baron Sandberg, English lieutenant and banker (d. 2017)
1928 – Pankaj Roy, Indian cricketer (d. 2001)
1929 – Menahem Golan, Israeli director and producer (d. 2014)
1930 – Clint Eastwood, American actor, director, musician, and producer
1931 – John Robert Schrieffer, American physicist and academic, Nobel Prize laureate (d. 2019)
  1931   – Shirley Verrett, American soprano and actress (d. 2010)
1932 – Ed Lincoln, Brazilian pianist, bassist, and composer (d. 2012)
  1932   – Jay Miner, American computer scientist and engineer (d. 1994)
1933 – Henry B. Eyring, American religious leader, educator, and author
1934 – Jim Hutton, American actor (d. 1979)
1935 – Jim Bolger, New Zealand businessman and politician, 35th Prime Minister of New Zealand
1938 – Johnny Paycheck, American singer-songwriter and guitarist (d. 2003)
  1938   – John Prescott, British sailor and politician, Deputy Prime Minister of the United Kingdom
  1938   – Peter Yarrow, American singer-songwriter, guitarist, and producer
1939 – Terry Waite, English humanitarian and author
1940 – Anatoliy Bondarchuk, Ukrainian hammer thrower and coach
  1940   – Augie Meyers, American musician and singer-songwriter
  1940   – Gilbert Shelton, American illustrator
1941 – June Clark, Welsh nurse and educator
  1941   – Louis Ignarro, American pharmacologist and academic, Nobel Prize laureate
  1941   – William Nordhaus, American economist and academic, Nobel Prize laureate
1943 – Sharon Gless, American actress
  1943   – Joe Namath, American football player, sportscaster, and actor
1945 – Rainer Werner Fassbinder, German actor, director, and screenwriter (d. 1982)
  1945   – Laurent Gbagbo, Ivorian academic and politician, 4th President of Côte d'Ivoire
  1945   – Bernard Goldberg, American journalist and author
1946 – Ted Baehr, American publisher and critic
  1946   – Steve Bucknor, Jamaican cricketer and umpire
  1946   – Jimmy Cliff, Jamaican singer and musician
  1946   – Krista Kilvet, Estonian journalist, politician, and diplomat (d. 2009)
  1946   – Debbie Moore, English model and businesswoman
1947 – Junior Campbell, Scottish singer-songwriter, guitarist, and producer 
  1947   – Gabriele Hinzmann, German discus thrower
1948 – Svetlana Alexievich, Belarusian journalist and author, Nobel Prize laureate
  1948   – John Bonham, English musician, songwriter and drummer (d. 1980)
  1948   – Martin Hannett, English bass player, guitarist, and record producer (d. 1991)
  1948   – Duncan Hunter, American lieutenant, lawyer, and politician
1949 – Tom Berenger, American actor, film producer and television writer
1950 – Jean Chalopin, French director, producer, and screenwriter, founded DIC Entertainment
  1950   – Gregory Harrison, American actor
  1950   – Edgar Savisaar, Estonian politician, Estonian Minister of the Interior (d. 2022)
1951 – Karl-Hans Riehm, German hammer thrower
1952 – Karl Bartos, German singer-songwriter and keyboard player 
1953 – Pirkka-Pekka Petelius, Finnish actor and screenwriter
1954 – Thomas Mavros, Greek footballer
  1954   – Vicki Sue Robinson, American actress and singer (d. 2000)
1955 – Tommy Emmanuel, Australian singer-songwriter and guitarist 
  1955   – Susie Essman, American actress, comedian, and screenwriter
1956 – Fritz Hilpert, German drummer and composer 
  1956   – John Young, English singer-songwriter and keyboard player
1957 – Jim Craig, American ice hockey player
1959 – Andrea de Cesaris, Italian racing driver (d. 2014)
  1959   – Phil Wilson, English politician
1960 – Greg Adams, Canadian ice hockey player and businessman
  1960   – Chris Elliott, American actor, comedian, and screenwriter
  1960   – Peter Winterbottom, English rugby player
1961 – Ray Cote, Canadian ice hockey player
  1961   – Justin Madden, Australian footballer and politician
  1961   – Lea Thompson, American actress, director, and producer
1962 – Corey Hart, Canadian singer-songwriter and producer
1963 – David Leigh, holder of the Sir Samuel Hall Chair of Chemistry at the University of Manchester
  1963   – Viktor Orbán, Hungarian politician, 38th Prime Minister of Hungary
  1963   – Wesley Willis, American singer-songwriter and keyboard player (d. 2003)
1964 – Leonard Asper, Canadian lawyer and businessman
  1964   – Stéphane Caristan, French hurdler and coach
  1964   – Yukio Edano, Japanese politician, Japanese Minister for Foreign Affairs
  1964   – Darryl "D.M.C." McDaniels, American rapper and producer
1965 – Brooke Shields, American model, actress, and producer
1966 – Diesel, American-Australian singer-songwriter and guitarist 
  1966   – Roshan Mahanama, Sri Lankan cricketer and referee
1967 – Phil Keoghan, New Zealand television host and producer
  1967   – Kenny Lofton, American baseball player, coach, and sportscaster
1971 – Arun Luthra, Indo-Anglo-American saxophonist, konnakol artist, composer, and arranger
1972 – Christian McBride, American bassist and record producer
  1972   – Archie Panjabi, British actress
  1972   – Frode Estil, Norwegian skier
  1972   – Antti Niemi, Finnish international footballer and coach
  1972   – Dave Roberts, American baseball player and coach
1974 – Hiroiki Ariyoshi, Japanese comedian and singer
1975 – Mac Suzuki, Japanese baseball player
1976 – Colin Farrell, Irish actor 
  1976   – Matt Harpring, American basketball player and sportscaster
1977 – Domenico Fioravanti, Italian swimmer
  1977   – Moses Sichone, Zambian footballer
1979 – Jean-François Gillet, Belgian footballer
1981 – Mikael Antonsson, Swedish footballer
  1981   – Daniele Bonera, Italian footballer
  1981   – Jake Peavy, American baseball player
  1981   – Marlies Schild, Austrian skier
1982 – Brett Firman, Australian rugby league player 
1984 – Andrew Bailey, American baseball player
  1984   – Milorad Čavić, Serbian swimmer
  1984   – Nate Robinson, American basketball player
1985 – Jordy Nelson, American football player
1986 – Robert Gesink, Dutch cyclist  
1989 – Marco Reus, German footballer
1990 – Erik Karlsson, Swedish ice hockey player
1992 – Michaël Bournival, Canadian ice hockey player
  1992   – Laura Ikauniece, Latvian heptathlete
1995 – Matthew Lodge, Australian rugby league player
1996 – Normani Kordei Hamilton, American singer
  1996   – Brandon Smith, New Zealand rugby league player
 1997 – Woo Jin-young, South Korean singer and rapper
1998 – Santino Ferrucci, American race car driver
2001 – Iga Świątek, Polish tennis player

Deaths

Pre-1600
 455 – Petronius Maximus, Roman emperor (b. 396)
 930 – Liu Hua, princess of Southern Han (b. 896)
 960 – Fujiwara no Morosuke, Japanese statesman (b. 909)
1076 – Waltheof, Earl of Northumbria, English politician (b. 1050)
1089 – Sigwin von Are, archbishop of Cologne
1162 – Géza II, king of Hungary (b. 1130)
1321 – Birger, king of Sweden (b. 1280)
1326 – Maurice de Berkeley, 2nd Baron Berkeley (b. 1271)
1329 – Albertino Mussato, Italian statesman and writer (b. 1261)
1349 – Thomas Wake, English politician (b. 1297)
1370 – Vitalis of Assisi, Italian hermit and monk (b. 1295)
1408 – Ashikaga Yoshimitsu, Japanese shōgun (b. 1358)
1410 – Martin of Aragon, Spanish king (b. 1356)
1504 – Engelbert II of Nassau (b. 1451)
1558 – Philip Hoby, English general and diplomat (b. 1505)
1567 – Guido de Bres, Belgian pastor and theologian (b. 1522)
1594 – Tintoretto, Italian painter and educator (b. 1518)

1601–1900
1601 – Gebhard Truchsess von Waldburg, Archbishop-Elector of Cologne (b. 1547)
1640 – Zeynab Begum, Safavid princess (date of birth unknown)
1665 – Pieter Jansz. Saenredam, Dutch painter (b. 1597)
1680 – Joachim Neander, German theologian and educator (b. 1650)
1740 – Frederick William I of Prussia (b. 1688)
1747 – Andrey Osterman, German-Russian politician, Russian Minister of Foreign Affairs (b. 1686)
1809 – Joseph Haydn, Austrian pianist and composer (b. 1732)
  1809   – Jean Lannes, French general (b. 1769)
1831 – Samuel Bentham, English architect and engineer (b. 1757)
1832 – Évariste Galois, French mathematician and theorist (b. 1811)
1837 – Joseph Grimaldi, English actor, comedian and dancer, (b. 1779)
1846 – Philip Marheineke, German pastor and philosopher (b. 1780)
1847 – Thomas Chalmers, Scottish minister and economist (b. 1780)
1848 – Eugénie de Guérin, French author (b. 1805)
1899 – Stefanos Koumanoudis, Greek archaeologist, teacher and writer (b. 1818)

1901–present
1908 – Louis-Honoré Fréchette, Canadian author, poet, and politician (b. 1839)
1909 – Thomas Price, Welsh-Australian politician, 24th Premier of South Australia (b. 1852)
1910 – Elizabeth Blackwell, English-American physician and educator (b. 1821)
1931 – Felix-Raymond-Marie Rouleau, Canadian cardinal (b. 1866)
  1931   – Willy Stöwer, German author and illustrator (b. 1864)
1945 – Odilo Globocnik, Italian-Austrian SS officer (b. 1904)
1954 – Antonis Benakis, Greek art collector and philanthropist, founded the Benaki Museum (b. 1873)
1957 – Stefanos Sarafis, Greek general and politician (b. 1890)
  1957   – Leopold Staff, Polish poet and academic (b. 1878)
1960 – Willem Elsschot, Flemish author and poet (b. 1882)
  1960   – Walther Funk, German economist, journalist, and politician, German Minister of Economics (b. 1890)
1962 – Henry F. Ashurst, American lawyer and politician (b. 1874)
1967 – Billy Strayhorn, American pianist and composer (b. 1915)
1970 – Terry Sawchuk, Canadian-American ice hockey player (b. 1929)
1976 – Jacques Monod, French biologist and geneticist, Nobel Prize laureate (b. 1910)
1977 – William Castle, American actor, director, producer, and screenwriter (b. 1914)
1978 – József Bozsik, Hungarian footballer and manager (b. 1925)
1981 – Barbara Ward, Baroness Jackson of Lodsworth, English economist and journalist (b. 1914)
1982 – Carlo Mauri, Italian mountaineer and explorer (b. 1930)
1983 – Jack Dempsey, American boxer and lieutenant (b. 1895)
1985 – Gaston Rébuffat, French mountaineer and author (b. 1921)
1986 – Jane Frank, American painter and sculptor (b. 1918)
  1986   – James Rainwater, American physicist and academic, Nobel Prize laureate (b. 1917)
1987 – John Abraham, Indian director and screenwriter (b. 1937)
1989 – Owen Lattimore, American author and academic (b. 1900)
  1989   – C. L. R. James, Trinidadian journalist and historian (b. 1901)
1993 – Honey Tree Evil Eye, or, Spuds MacKenzie, Bud Light Bull Terrier mascot (b. 1983)
1994 – Uzay Heparı, Turkish actor, producer, and composer (b. 1969)
  1994   – Herva Nelli, Italian-American soprano (b. 1909)
1995 – Stanley Elkin, American novelist, short story writer, and essayist (b. 1930)
1996 – Timothy Leary, American psychologist and author (b. 1920)
1998 – Charles Van Acker, Belgian-American race car driver (b. 1912)
2000 – Petar Mladenov, Bulgarian diplomat, 1st President of Bulgaria (b. 1936)
  2000   – A. Jeyaratnam Wilson, Sri Lankan historian, author, and academic (b. 1928)
2001 – Arlene Francis, American actress, talk show host, game show panelist, and television personality (b. 1907)
2002 – Subhash Gupte, Indian cricketer (b. 1929)
2004 – Aiyathurai Nadesan, Sri Lankan journalist (b. 1954)
  2004   – Robert Quine, American guitarist (b. 1941)
  2004   – Étienne Roda-Gil, French screenwriter and composer (b. 1941)
2006 – Miguel Ortiz Berrocal, Spanish sculptor (b. 1933)
  2006   – Raymond Davis, Jr., American physicist and chemist, Nobel Prize laureate (b. 1914)
2009 – Danny La Rue, Irish-British drag queen performer and singer (b. 1927)
  2009   – George Tiller, American physician (b. 1941)
2010 – Louise Bourgeois, French-American sculptor and painter (b. 1911)
  2010   – Brian Duffy, English photographer and producer (b. 1933)
  2010   – William A. Fraker, American director, producer, and cinematographer (b. 1923)
  2010   – Rubén Juárez, Argentinian singer-songwriter and bandoneón player (b. 1947)
  2010   – Merata Mita, New Zealand director, producer, and screenwriter (b. 1942)
2011 – Pauline Betz, American tennis player (b. 1919)
  2011   – Jonas Bevacqua, American fashion designer, co-founded the Lifted Research Group (b. 1977)
  2011   – Derek Hodge, Virgin Islander lawyer and politician, Lieutenant Governor of the United States Virgin Islands (b. 1941)
  2011   – Hans Keilson, German-Dutch psychoanalyst and author (b. 1909)
  2011   – John Martin, English admiral and politician, Lieutenant Governor of Guernsey (b. 1918)
  2011   – Andy Robustelli, American football player and manager (b. 1925)
2012 – Christopher Challis, English cinematographer (b. 1919)
  2012   – Randall B. Kester, American lawyer and judge (b. 1916)
  2012   – Paul Pietsch, German racing driver and publisher (b. 1911)
  2012   – Orlando Woolridge, American basketball player and coach (b. 1959)
2013 – Gerald E. Brown, American physicist and academic (b. 1926)
  2013   – Frederic Lindsay, Scottish author and educator (b. 1933)
  2013   – Miguel Méndez, American author and poet (b. 1930)
  2013   – Tim Samaras, American engineer and storm chaser (b. 1957)
  2013   – Jairo Mora Sandoval, Costa Rican environmentalist (b. 1987)
  2013   – Jean Stapleton, American actress (b. 1923)
2014 – Marilyn Beck, American journalist (b. 1928)
  2014   – Marinho Chagas, Brazilian footballer and coach (b. 1952)
  2014   – Hoss Ellington, American race car driver (b. 1935)
  2014   – Martha Hyer, American actress (b. 1924)
  2014   – Lewis Katz, American businessman and philanthropist (b. 1942)
  2014   – Mary Soames, Baroness Soames, English author (b. 1922)
2015 – Gladys Taylor, Canadian author and publisher (b. 1917)
2016 – Mohamed Abdelaziz, President of the Sahrawi Arab Democratic Republic (1976–2016) (b. 1947)
  2016   – Jan Crouch, American televangelist, co-founder of the Trinity Broadcasting Network (b. 1938)
  2016   – Carla Lane, English television writer (b. 1928)
  2016   – Rupert Neudeck, German journalist and humanitarian (b. 1939)
2022 – Krishnakumar Kunnath, Indian singer (b. 1968)
  2022   – Gilberto Rodríguez Orejuela, Colombian drug lord (b.1939)
  2022   – Colin Cantwell, American concept artist and director (b.1932)
  2022   – Jim Parks, English cricketer (b. 1931)

Holidays and observances
Anniversary of Royal Brunei Malay Regiment (Brunei)
Christian feast day:
Camilla Battista da Varano
Hermias
Petronella
Visitation of Mary (Western Christianity)
May 31 (Eastern Orthodox liturgics)
The beginning of Gawai Dayak (Dayaks in Sarawak, Malaysia and West Kalimantan, Indonesia)
World No Tobacco Day (International)

References

Sources

External links

 BBC: On This Day
 
 Historical Events on May 31

Days of the year
May
Discordian holidays